Tappeh Salam (also Romanized as Tappeh Salām) is a village in Meyami Rural District, Razaviyeh District, Mashhad County, Razavi Khorasan Province, Iran. At the 2006 census, its population was 3,536, in 884 families.

References 

Populated places in Mashhad County